The women's 4 × 100 metres relay event at the 1948 Olympic Games took place on August 7.  The Dutch team won with a time of 47.5.

Records
Prior to the competition, the existing World and Olympic records were as follows.

Schedule
All times are British Summer Time (UTC+1)

Results

Round 1
Round 1 took place on 7 August. The first two teams from each heat advanced to the final.

Heat 1

Heat 2

Heat 3

Final

Wind: 0.2 m/s

References

External links
Organising Committee for the XIV Olympiad, The (1948). The Official Report of the Organising Committee for the XIV Olympiad. LA84 Foundation. Retrieved 4 September 2016.

Women's 4x100 metre relay
Relay foot races at the Olympics
4 × 100 metres relay
1948 in women's athletics
Women's events at the 1948 Summer Olympics